Inter-Korean summits are meetings between the leaders of North and South Korea. To date, there have been five such meetings so far (2000, 2007, April 2018, May 2018, and September 2018), three of them being in Pyongyang, with another two in Panmunjom. The importance of these summits lies in the lack of formal communication between North and South Korea, which makes discussing political and economic issues difficult. The summits' agendas have included topics such as the ending of the 1950-53 war (currently there is an armistice in force), the massive deployment of troops at the DMZ (approximately two million in total), the development of nuclear weapons by North Korea, and human rights issues.

2000 summit 

In 2000, the representatives of the two governments met for the first time since the division of the Korean peninsula. Kim Dae-jung, the President of South Korea, who arrived at Pyongyang Sunan International Airport, met Kim Jong-il, Supreme Leader of North Korea, directly under the trap of the airport, and the rallies and divisions of the People's Army Corps were held.

 Participants: Kim Dae-jung, President of South Korea, and Kim Jong-il, Supreme Leader of North Korea
 Place of meeting: Pyongyang, North Korea
 Date of the meeting: June 13–15, 2000
 Results of talks: June 15th North–South Joint Declaration

2007 summit 

In June 2007, a summit declaration was adopted, which included the realization of the June 15 Joint Declaration, the promotion of a three-party or four-party summit meeting to resolve the nuclear issue on the Korean peninsula, and active promotion of inter-Korean economic cooperation projects.

 Participants: Roh Moo-hyun, President of South Korea, and Kim Jong-il, Supreme Leader of North Korea
 Place of meeting: Pyongyang, North Korea
 Date of the meeting: October 2–4, 2007
 Results of talks: 2007 North–South Summit Declaration

April 2018 summit 

A summit was held on 27 April 2018 in South Korea's portion of the Joint Security Area. It was the third summit between South and North Korea, agreed by South Korea's President, Moon Jae-in, and North Korea's Supreme Leader, Kim Jong-un.

 Participants: Moon Jae-in, President of South Korea, and Kim Jong-un, Supreme Leader of North Korea
 Place of meeting: Joint Security Area, South Korea
 Date of the meeting: April 27, 2018
 Results of talks: Panmunjom Declaration

May 2018 summit

On 26 May 2018, Kim and Moon met again in the Joint Security Area. The meeting took two hours, and unlike other summits it had not been publicly announced beforehand.

September 2018 summit

On 13 August, Blue House announced that South Korea's President will be attending the third inter-Korean summit with leader Kim Jong-un at Pyongyang on 18–20 September. The agenda would be finding the strategy of the breakthrough in its hampered talks with U.S and solution for the denuclearization on the Korean peninsula.

 Participants: Moon Jae-in, President of South Korea, and Kim Jong-un, Supreme Leader of North Korea
 Place of meeting: Pyongyang, North Korea
 Date of the meeting: September 18–20, 2018
 Results of talks:  along with a commitment for a future summit meeting in Seoul.

See also

 2018–19 Korean peace process
 Sunshine Policy
 Northern Limit Line
 Peace Treaty on Korean Peninsula
 2018 North Korea–United States Singapore Summit
 2019 North Korea–United States Hanoi Summit
 2019 Koreas–United States DMZ Summit

Press releases
Two Koreas to hold summit (CNN, Aug 7, 2007)
New hope of inter-Korean detente (UPI, Aug 10, 2007) 
Inter-Korean summit (chinaview, Aug 8, 2007)
Korean summit postponed by floods (CNN, Aug 18, 2007)

Footnotes

References
The Second inter-Korean summit: Four Arguments Against and Why They Could Be Wrong (quoted by nautilus.org)
Ban Ki-moon welcomes forthcoming inter-Korean summit
Inter-Korean summit welcome
Looking forward to new aspect of inter-Korean summit
the eight-point agreement by the leaders of the two Koreas at the end of their summit (quoted by koreanblog.com)
2nd South-North Korean Summit Joint Statement, The Institute for Far Eastern Studies, Kyungnam University

External links

The inter-Korean summit:Evaluation and Tasks Ahead
The inter-Korean summit and Unification Formulae
Landmark inter-Korean summit begins with unification pledge
The official homepage of 2007 inter-Korean summit
The official website of the Republic of Korea
Inter-Korean dialogue

Politics of Korea
2000 in North Korea
2007 in North Korea
2000 in South Korea
2007 in South Korea
2000 in international relations
2007 in international relations
North Korea–South Korea relations